Michael Lennox Blake (July 5, 1945 – May 2, 2015) was an American author, best known for the film adaptation of his novel Dances with Wolves, for which he won an Academy Award for Best Adapted Screenplay.

Biography
Early in his life, Blake's family lived in Texas, before moving to Southern California, where they moved frequently. He began writing when he was stationed at Walker Air Force Base, where he wrote for the base newspaper. He studied journalism at the University of New Mexico, and later studied at a film school in Berkeley, California. He also attended Eastern New Mexico University in Portales. In the late 1970s, he moved to Los Angeles; during the 1980s, only one of his screenplays was produced, called Stacy's Knights. The movie starred Kevin Costner, who later encouraged him to continue to write, and introduced him to key figures in the Hollywood Industry. Dances with Wolves was the result; Kevin Costner then asked him to write a screenplay for the film based on the novel.  He went on to do humanitarian work, and continued to write.

Michael Blake had three brothers, James A. Webb, David Webb and Dan Webb, former principal of John Muir High School in Pasadena, California.

He died on May 2, 2015, after a long illness in Tucson, Arizona.

Works

Screenplays
 Stacy's Knights (1983)
 Dances with Wolves (1990)
 Winding Stair (1998) also directed
 The One (in development)
 The Holy Road (in development)
 Winnetou (in development)

Novels
 Dances with Wolves (1988) Fawcett Gold Medal 
 Airman Mortensen (1991) Seven Wolves Publishing 
 Marching to Valhalla (1996) Villard Books 
 The Holy Road (2001) Villard Books 
 Dances with Wolves, 20th Anniversary (2011 eBook) ZOVA Books
 The Holy Road (2011) ZOVA Books 
 Into the Stars (2011) ZOVA Books

Non-fiction
 Like a Running Dog (2002) Autobiography
 Indian Yell (2006)
 Twelve the King (2009)

Awards
 Academy Award for Best Writing (Adapted Screenplay)
 Golden Globe Award for Best Screenplay
 Writers Guild of America Award for Best Screenplay Based on Material from Another Medium
 Spur Award for Best Motion Picture
 Cancervive Victory Award
 Eleanor Roosevelt Award for work with minorities and the environment
 Animal Protection Institute’s Humanitarian of the Year
 Air Force Sergeants Association’s Americanism Award (1992)
 Amanda Blake Award
 American Library Association's Library Hero Award
 Environmental Media Award
 Golden Quill

References

External links

 
 

20th-century American novelists
20th-century American male writers
1945 births
2015 deaths
People from Portales, New Mexico
Writers from New Mexico
Novelists from North Carolina
Eastern New Mexico University alumni
Writers Guild of America Award winners
University of New Mexico alumni
American male screenwriters
21st-century American novelists
Best Screenplay Golden Globe winners
Best Adapted Screenplay Academy Award winners
American male novelists
21st-century American male writers
People from Fort Bragg, North Carolina
Screenwriters from North Carolina
Screenwriters from New Mexico